Gennaro Ivan Gattuso  (born 9 January 1978) is an Italian professional football coach and former player, who last served as manager of La Liga club Valencia.

He was born in Corigliano (Calabria). As a player, he mainly played in the centre as a defensive midfielder, although he was also capable of playing on the wing. He initially played for Perugia, Salernitana, and Rangers, though he is mostly remembered for his time with AC Milan in Serie A, where he won the Champions League, in 2002–03 and 2006–07, the Coppa Italia in 2002–03, and also the Serie A title in 2003–04 and 2010–11. In addition to these titles, he won two Italian Supercups, two UEFA Supercups, and a FIFA Club World Cup. At international level, he represented the Italy national football team at the 2000 Summer Olympics, three FIFA World Cups, two UEFA European Championships, and the 2009 FIFA Confederations Cup.

Gattuso's talismanic midfield partnership with playmaker Andrea Pirlo, both at club and international level, played a key role in Italy's World Cup victory in 2006, as well as Milan's domestic, European, and international successes during the mid-2000s. Despite not being blessed with notable technical skills, Gattuso's pace, strength, and work-rate complemented and supported Pirlo's composed, creative playing style, while his energy, aggression, and hard-tackling style of play enabled him to make a name for himself as one of the best players in the world in his position. In addition to his ball-winning abilities, Gattuso was renowned for his competitive nature and leadership qualities throughout his career, often wearing the captain's armband for Milan following Paolo Maldini's retirement.

Gattuso's coaching career began as player-coach of his final club, Sion of the Swiss Super League, and he also had short spells in charge of Palermo and OFI Crete. In June 2016, he led Pisa to Serie B promotion. He later coached both the youth side and the first team of his former club Milan between 2017 and 2019, before being appointed as manager of Napoli later that year, where he won his first title as a coach, the 2019–20 Coppa Italia.

Club career

Early career
Gattuso was born in Corigliano Calabro, Italy. He started his career with Umbrian side Perugia, but transferred in July 1997, at the age of 19, to the Scottish team Rangers.

Walter Smith, who brought Gattuso to Glasgow, left the club in 1998. Smith's successor, Dick Advocaat, did not favour Gattuso and, after being played out-of-position as a right-back, the Italian was sold in October 1998 to then recently promoted Serie A club Salernitana for £4 million.

AC Milan
Gattuso was bought by AC Milan for €8 million from Salernitana in the summer of 1999. He made his debut with the club on 15 September 1999, in a 0–0 away draw with Chelsea in the UEFA Champions League; he soon broke into the starting line-up that season, also playing his first Milan-derby match on 24 October 1999, in which he stood out and immediately endeared himself with the Milan fans for the maturity and tenacity he demonstrated when facing Inter striker Ronaldo, who was widely regarded as the best player in the world at the time.

During his time at the club, Gattuso's work-rate and versatility as a ball-winner later allowed Milan manager Carlo Ancelotti to place midfield playmaker Andrea Pirlo alongside him in a more creative, attacking position, while Gattuso supported him in a deeper role, as a defensive midfielder; this midfield partnership was pivotal to Milan's domestic and international successes under Ancelotti, which included the Coppa Italia, the UEFA Champions League and the UEFA Super Cup in 2003, as well as the Serie A title and the Supercoppa Italiana in 2004. Gattuso signed a contract extension with Milan in June 2003 and in October 2004. During this period, Gattuso also reached the 2005 UEFA Champions League Final with Milan, only to be defeated by Liverpool on penalties, after initially leading 3–0 at half-time.

Gattuso played his 300th game for the club in a goalless Champions League draw against Lille on 26 September 2006, and he extended his current deal with Milan until 2011 on 1 February 2007. On 23 May 2007, Gattuso won the Champions League for the second time in his career when Milan beat Liverpool 2–1 in the final.

After winning the FIFA Club World Cup, on 27 December 2007, Gattuso trained with his former club Rangers to regain fitness during the Serie A winter break whilst his wife was visiting family in Scotland over Christmas. The following December, Gattuso suffered a torn Anterior cruciate ligament early on in the 1–0 league win against Catania. Despite the injury, however, Gattuso played the entire 90 minutes before being diagnosed by the club doctors after the match. He underwent surgery to repair the damage on 19 December 2008 in Antwerp, Belgium. He was expected to miss up to six months of action but managed to return to the Milan bench on 10 May against Juventus, a month ahead of schedule.

On 22 August 2009, he made his 400th appearance with Milan in the opening match of the 2009–10 Serie A season against Siena, wearing the captain's armband. It was confirmed by Milan on 14 December 2009 that Gattuso would remain a Milan player until 30 June 2012, after adding one more year to his current contract.

The 2010–11 season with Milan was one of Gattuso's best seasons of his career, and saw him end a three-year goal drought with a left-footed strike from outside the box, which proved to be the decisive goal in a 1–0 victory over Juventus on 5 March 2011. Gattuso later celebrated another goal in a 4–1 victory against Cagliari with a long-distance header that beat the goalkeeper, who was off his line. Gattuso celebrated Milan's 18th Scudetto victory after a scoreless draw against Roma on 7 May.

Gattuso had been experiencing vision problems in early September 2011, a few days before the season kicked off. On 9 September 2011, Gattuso crashed into teammate Alessandro Nesta whilst playing against Lazio in Milan's opening Serie A game of the 2011–12 season. He was substituted off directly afterward in the 20th minute and diagnosed with a left sixth cranial nerve palsy, resulting in double vision, an injury that could have ended his football career. He later revealed that he had seen teammate Zlatan Ibrahimović in four different positions during the opening stages of the match, and was unable to see Nesta, resulting in the pair's clash.

On 11 May 2012, Gattuso confirmed that he would not renew his contract with the club which was due to expire on 30 June and that he would be leaving Milan at the end of the season.

Sion
On 15 June 2012, after being released by Milan, Gattuso joined Swiss club Sion. He had been linked with a deal to join former club Rangers in Scotland, but the deal fell through because of the club's financial difficulties. On 25 February 2013, Gattuso was named as the new manager of Sion after manager Víctor Muñoz was demoted to a scouting role after a 4–0 defeat by Thun in the Swiss Super League.

Controversies
In a UEFA Champions League group stage match against Ajax in September 2003, he was sent off during second-half injury time after slapping Ajax striker Zlatan Ibrahimović in the face with the back of his hand. His temper caused him further problems when in December 2005, at the final whistle of Milan's 3–2 defeat of Schalke 04 in the Champions League, Gattuso was seen seeking out and taunting Schalke's midfielder Christian Poulsen as a reaction to Poulsen's fierce marking of Kaká in the first leg. Gattuso insisted, however, that the press exaggerated the significance of the incident.

On 15 February 2011, during Milan's Champions League game against Tottenham Hotspur, Gattuso pushed Tottenham coach Joe Jordan away by the throat during an incident on the sideline. Jordan was seen outside his allowed technical area exchanging words with Gattuso, in relation to the relatively physical game that had been played. After the game, after Gattuso had shaken hands with the Tottenham players, video footage showed him confronting Jordan and head-butting him after another exchange of words, before being restrained by both teammates and opponents. "I lost control. There is no excuse for what I did. I take my responsibilities for that", said the 33-year-old Gattuso, but he also said Jordan provoked him throughout the game but refused to say what his comments were. Newspapers, however, reported Joe Jordan had been using racist, offensive calls for much of the game by calling Gattuso a "fucking Italian bastard" from the sidelines. The following day, it was announced that UEFA was looking at additional sanctions or punishment for Gattuso's actions against Jordan the previous day and had been charged with "gross unsporting conduct." Gattuso was then suspended for five Champions League matches – one for yellow card accumulation, the other four for the incident with Jordan. The Tottenham coach also received a touchline ban by UEFA for his involvement in the exchange.

On 2 December 2012, Gattuso, in a game in the Swiss Super League, took the yellow card from referee Nikolaj Hänni's hand and gave it back after gestures.

International career

Gattuso represented the Italy under-18 side at the 1995 UEFA European Under-18 Football Championships, where Italy finished in second place to Spain following a 4–1 final defeat; he also represented the Italy under-21 side at the 2000 UEFA European Under-21 Football Championship, where Italy went on to win the tournament with a 2–1 victory over the Czech Republic in the final.

Gattuso was capped 73 times for his country at senior level, and played in the 2000 Summer Olympics, the 2002 World Cup, Euro 2004, the 2006 World Cup, Euro 2008, the 2009 Confederations Cup, and the 2010 World Cup. He made his senior international debut under Dino Zoff, at the age of 22, in a 1–0 friendly home victory over Sweden, on 23 February 2000. He made his first start for Italy later that year, under Giovanni Trapattoni, on 15 November, scoring the only goal in a 1–0 friendly home victory over England with a powerful strike from outside the area; this was his first and only goal for Italy.

Gattuso made two substitute appearances at the 2002 World Cup, first in his nation's 2–0 opening group win against Ecuador, and secondly in Italy's controversial 2–1 extra-time defeat to co-hosts South Korea in the round of 16 of the competition. He also later appeared in Italy's two opening group matches at Euro 2004, against Denmark (0–0) and Sweden (1–1), but missed out on Italy's final match against Bulgaria (2–1) due to a suspension following an accumulation of two yellow cards in the first two matches of the competition; despite a 2–1 win, Italy were eliminated from the tournament in the first round on direct encounters, following a three-way five-point tie with Denmark and Sweden.

Gattuso was named to Italy's 23-man squad for the 2006 World Cup, and was one of the key players in Italy's eventual victory in the tournament under manager Marcello Lippi; he won the Man of the Match award for his performance in his nation's 3–0 victory in the quarter-finals of the tournament, against Ukraine. He and Andrea Pirlo formed a formidable partnership in the heart of midfield, with Gattuso supporting Pirlo's creative playmaking duties with his work-rate and ability to break down possession. While Pirlo finished as one of the top assist providers in the tournament, Gattuso won more challenges than any other player in the tournament (47 – 11 more than Patrick Vieira in second place) and completed 351 passes out of the 392 he attempted; he also provided an assist during the tournament, helping to set up Filippo Inzaghi's goal in a 2–0 win over the Czech Republic in Italy's final group match of the tournament on 22 June. Gattuso achieved a measure of notoriety for his post-match celebrations after Italy won the World Cup final on penalties against France on 9 July, during which he removed his shorts and ran around the pitch in his underpants, until FIFA officials forced him to cover up. He was named to the tournament's All Star Team for his performances.

Under Roberto Donadoni at Euro 2008, Gattuso played in the matches against Netherlands (a 0–3 loss) and France (a 2–0 win) in the group stage, but was suspended for the quarter-final match against eventual champions Spain, along with Andrea Pirlo; in their absence, Italy went on to lose 4–2 in the ensuing penalty shoot-out after a 0–0 draw following extra-time.

On 19 November 2008, he made his first appearance as Italy's captain, taking the armband following Fabio Cannavaro's substitution in the 61st minute of a friendly against Greece. Despite having only recently recovered from a serious knee injury, Lippi included Gattuso in Italy's squad for the 2009 FIFA Confederations Cup, where they suffered a first round elimination. At the tournament, Gattuso gained notoriety against Egypt when he got tripped up by Mohamed Aboutrika, and his shorts fell down, revealing his underpants.

In June 2010, he announced that he would retire from international duty after the 2010 World Cup in South Africa, where he participated in his nation's final group match against Slovakia – his last game for the national side, as Italy suffered a first round elimination following a 3–2 defeat.

Style of play

Considered by pundits to be one of the greatest holding midfielders of all time, throughout his career, Gattuso mainly played as a central or defensive midfielder, although he was even deployed on the right flank on occasion, either as a full back, wing-back, or as a winger, due to his versatility; he was also capable of playing as a central defender. Despite not being particularly skilful from a technical standpoint (although he was able to improve in this area with time under the tutelage of Mauro Tassotti), or particularly tall, Gattuso was a physically strong, consistent, aggressive, and hard-tackling midfielder, with an extremely high work rate; he also possessed a powerful shot, and quick reactions, as well as an excellent positional sense and good anticipation, which enabled him to excel in this position; in his prime, he was widely regarded as one of the best defensive midfielders in the world. His energetic and combative box-to-box style of play, as well as his pace, tactical awareness and abilities as a ball-winner, allowed him to form a successful midfield partnership with playmaker Andrea Pirlo throughout his career, both at club and international level. Gattuso's deeper position on the pitch allowed him to support Pirlo and his other teammates defensively by breaking up the opposition's attacks; he often only advanced in order to intercept the ball and play it to one of his more creative or offensive teammates after winning back possession, subsequently returning to his more defensive midfield role. His tenacity on the pitch, exemplified by his fierce challenges and stamina, earned him the nickname Ringhio (Snarl). In addition to his footballing abilities, he also stood out for his competitive spirit, determination, and leadership.

Managerial career

Sion
Gattuso started his coaching career in 2011 by attending a course for UEFA A Licence, when he still played for AC Milan. He passed the exam in July.

On 25 February 2013, Gattuso was named as the new manager of Sion after manager Víctor Muñoz was demoted to a scouting role after a 4–0 defeat by Thun in the Swiss Super League. Gattuso became the fifth manager of the club in the 2012–13 season. On 27 February 2013, Gattuso won his first match as a manager, beating Lausanne 2–0 away in a Swiss Cup match. Gattuso was sacked on 13 May 2013.

Palermo
Later in May 2013, he was heavily linked with the managerial post at Palermo, after the Sicilians were relegated to Serie B. On 3 June 2013, Maurizio Zamparini confirmed he had a verbal agreement with Gattuso, subjected to a contract release with then manager Giuseppe Sannino. The appointment was made official later on 19 June, after Gattuso successfully rescinded his contract with Sion. Gattuso named Luigi Riccio as his assistant, with whom he worked at Sion. His experience as rosanero head coach was however short-lived, as he was sacked 25 September 2013 after achieving only two wins and a draw in the first six games of the league season.

During 2013–14 season, he also attended a course for UEFA Pro Licence, after which he passed the exam in September 2014.

OFI Crete
On 5 June 2014, Gattuso was appointed manager of Superleague Greece team OFI Crete.

While managing OFI Crete, in the first few months there were rumours that the players and coaching staff were not getting paid due to the poor financial situation of the club. Gattuso lashed out at media saying that it wasn't true that he wanted to leave. Throughout the press conference, he controversially threw out curse words and banged on the table.

On 26 October 2014 Gattuso tended his resignation as head coach of OFI Crete, following a 2–3 home loss to Asteras Tripolis, citing the club's financial difficulties as one of the main reasons behind his decision. However, on the very next day he changed his mind after having been persuaded by the club supporters and the board to stay. On 30 December 2014, Gattuso officially resigned as OFI Crete manager, due to the club's financial problems.

In January 2015, he applied for the manager's position at Scottish club Hamilton Academical following the departure of Alex Neil.

Pisa
Gattuso was appointed as the manager of the then Lega Pro side Pisa on 20 August 2015. On 12 June 2016, he led Pisa to Serie B promotion after beating out Foggia 5–3 on aggregate in the Lega Pro promotion play-off final. On 31 July however, he suddenly left Pisa, citing "serious, constant and unacceptable" problems at the club being the reason for his departure. One month after leaving the club, he re-joined Pisa as the team's head coach. However, in the following season, Pisa finishes in last place with the second best defense, but the worst attack in the league, and Gattuso resigns again, this time definitely.

AC Milan (youth)
In May 2017 Gattuso was appointed as the coach of AC Milan Primavera, the under-19 team of the club. He was the third former player who won 2007 UEFA Champions League, to coach the Primavera team, after Filippo Inzaghi (2013–14) and Cristian Brocchi (2014–2016). They also coached the first team, after the sacking of Clarence Seedorf (also a former Milan player and 2007 Champions League winner) and Siniša Mihajlović respectively.

As of round 10 of the Campionato Nazionale Primavera (which ended on 26 November), the Milan Primavera side was ranked third (out of 16 teams) in the league's first division.

AC Milan
On 27 November 2017, Vincenzo Montella was sacked by AC Milan. Subsequently, they appointed Gattuso as the head coach of the first team, who left the position as the coach of the under-19s. He recorded his first win with a 2–1 home victory against Bologna in Serie A on 10 December. Milan finished the season in 6th place.

In April 2018, Gattuso's contract was extended to 2021. In his first full season in charge, Milan missed out on Champions League by 1 point, finishing 5th on 68 points. On 28 May 2019, he departed Milan by mutual consent.

Napoli
On 11 December 2019, Gattuso was appointed head coach of Napoli following the sacking of Carlo Ancelotti the previous day.

On 13 June 2020, Napoli achieved a 1–1 home draw with Inter in the second leg of the Coppa Italia semi-finals, which allowed them to progress to the 2020 Coppa Italia Final following a 2–1 aggregate victory; Gattuso dedicated the achievement to his sister, who had recently died. On 17 June, Napoli went on to win the final against Juventus 4–2 on penalties after a goalless draw. 

On 23 May 2021, the final day of the league, Gattuso was unable to secure a fourth-place finish for Napoli after a 1–1 home draw with Verona, finishing fifth. One point below Juventus, who secured qualification to the following season's Champions League after a victory at Bologna. The club's chairman, Aurelio De Laurentiis, put an end to Gattuso's tenure as the head coach of Napoli after one year and a half.

Fiorentina
On 25 May, Fiorentina announced the appointment of Gattuso as their new head coach, effective from 1 July. However, on 17 June, just two weeks before his contract was due to begin on 1 July, Gattuso and Fiorentina mutually rescinded the agreement.

Valencia
On 9 June 2022, Gattuso was unveiled as the new manager of Valencia, competing in the Spanish La Liga, on a two-season deal. In the process, he became the third Italian manager to ever be appointed by and guide the Valencian team, following Claudio Ranieri and Cesare Prandelli. On 30 January 2023, he left his position at Valencia by mutual consent with the club.

Personal life
Gattuso is married to Monica Romano, a Scottish woman of Italian descent. Her father Mario was a millionaire restaurateur who died in 2011, and her sister is television presenter Carla Romano. They have two children.

In January 2010, Gattuso opened a fish shop in his home town of Corigliano Calabro.

Gattuso is a Catholic, and when he played for Rangers, a club with a Protestant identity in the 1997–98 season, he alleged that his teammates ordered him to take off his crucifix necklace.

Gattuso's sister, Francesca, died in June 2020 at the age of 37. She had been in intensive care since February.

Gattuso suffers from an auto-immune disease named ocular myasthenia since his days as a footballer. He opened up about his illness in late 2020 after he appeared on the pitch wearing an eyepatch during several games.

Media
In December 2003, Gattuso participated on the Italian version of Who Wants to Be a Millionaire?, Chi vuol essere milionario?, alongside Christian Vieri during an episode organised for charity. The pair ended the game on the second-to-last question, winning €150,000. On the question before, when the pair were doubtful about the correct answer, Vincenzo Montella, one of the football players who were in the audience, invited them to walk away with €70,000 instead of taking the risk of answering incorrectly and dropping down to €16,000. Vieri playfully suggested selling the player ("Ma vendetelo!"), while Gattuso jokingly asked for Montella to be sent out of the studio as he was behaving like a jinx ("Porta una sfiga Montella, mandatelo via!").

Gattuso features in EA Sports' FIFA football video game series; he was included in the Ultimate Team Legends in FIFA 16 and later iterations of the game.

Career statistics

Club

International

Managerial statistics

Honours

Player
Perugia Youth
Trofeo Giacinto Facchetti: 1995–96

AC Milan
Serie A: 2003–04, 2010–11
Coppa Italia: 2002–03
Supercoppa Italiana: 2004, 2011
UEFA Champions League: 2002–03, 2006–07
UEFA Super Cup: 2003, 2007
FIFA Club World Cup: 2007

Italy U21
UEFA Under-21 European Championship: 2000

Italy
FIFA World Cup: 2006

Individual
FIFA World Cup All-Star Team: 2006
Premio Nazionale Carriera Esemplare "Gaetano Scirea": 2012
FIFPro World XI: Nominee 2005, 2006, 2007, 2008
AC Milan Hall of Fame

Orders
 CONI: Golden Collar of Sports Merit: 2006

 4th Class / Officer: Ufficiale Ordine al Merito della Repubblica Italiana: 2006

Manager
Napoli
Coppa Italia: 2019–20

Notes

References

External links

 
 
 

1978 births
Living people
Sportspeople from the Province of Cosenza
People from Corigliano Calabro
Italian Roman Catholics
Italian footballers
Association football midfielders
A.C. Perugia Calcio players
Rangers F.C. players
U.S. Salernitana 1919 players
A.C. Milan players
FC Sion players
Serie B players
Serie A players
Scottish Football League players
Scottish Premier League players
Swiss Super League players
UEFA Champions League winning players
Italy youth international footballers
Italy under-21 international footballers
Olympic footballers of Italy
Italy international footballers
Footballers at the 2000 Summer Olympics
UEFA Euro 2004 players
UEFA Euro 2008 players
2002 FIFA World Cup players
2006 FIFA World Cup players
2009 FIFA Confederations Cup players
2010 FIFA World Cup players
FIFA World Cup-winning players
Italian expatriate footballers
Italian expatriate sportspeople in Scotland
Italian expatriate sportspeople in Switzerland
Expatriate footballers in Scotland
Expatriate footballers in Switzerland
Italian football managers
Association football player-managers
FC Sion managers
Palermo F.C. managers
OFI Crete F.C. managers
Pisa S.C. managers
A.C. Milan managers
S.S.C. Napoli managers
Valencia CF managers
Super League Greece managers
Serie A managers
La Liga managers
Italian expatriate football managers
Italian expatriate sportspeople in Greece
Expatriate football managers in Switzerland
Expatriate football managers in Greece
Expatriate football managers in Spain
Officers of the Order of Merit of the Italian Republic
Footballers from Calabria